Miloš Korolija (Serbian Cyrillic: Милош Королија; November 21, 1981) is a Serbian water polo coach and former player. He currently serves as the head coach for VK Partizan.

Clubs honours
 2010-11 LEN Euroleague -  Champion, with Partizan Raiffeisen

External links
 Miloš Korolija Profile

1981 births
Living people
Serbian male water polo players
Mediterranean Games bronze medalists for Serbia
Competitors at the 2005 Mediterranean Games
Mediterranean Games medalists in water polo
Universiade medalists in water polo
Universiade gold medalists for Serbia and Montenegro